Bisphenol A diglycidyl ether (commonly abbreviated BADGE or DGEBA) is an organic compound and is a liquid epoxy resin.  The compound is a colorless viscous liquid (commercial samples can appear pale straw-coloured). It is a key component of many epoxy resin formulations. Addition of further Bisphenol A and a catalyst and heat can produce Bisphenol A glycidyl ether epoxy resins of higher molecular weight that are solid.

Preparation and reactions
It is prepared by O-alkylation of bisphenol A with epichlorohydrin.  This reaction mainly affords bisphenol A diglycidyl ether, as well as some oligomer. The degree of polymerization may be as low as 0.1.  The epoxide content of such epoxy resins is of interest.  This parameter is commonly expressed as the epoxide number, which is the number of epoxide equivalents in 1 kg of resin (Eq./kg), or as the equivalent weight, which is the weight in grams of resin containing 1 mole equivalent of epoxide (g/mol).  Since unsymmetrical epoxides are chiral, the bis epoxide consists of three stereoisomers, although these are not separated.

Bisphenol A diglycidyl ether slowly hydrolyzes to 2,2-bis[4(2,3-dihydroxypropoxy)phenyl)propane (bis-HPPP).

Similarly, DGEBA reacts with acrylic acid to give vinyl ester resins.  The reaction results in opening of the epoxide ring, generating unsaturated esters at each terminus of the molecule.  Such materials are often diluted with styrene and converted to resin.

Epoxy resins are thermosetting polymers, which are crosslinked using hardeners (curing agents). The most common curing agents for epoxy resins are polyamines, aminoamides, and phenolic compounds.

Safety
BADGE is highly reactive and forms a number of species upon exposure to water or HCl and many of these compounds (including BADGE) are suspected endocrine disruptors Hydrolysis of the ether bonds liberates bisphenol A, which is also strongly suspected of being an endocrine disruptor. 
From the 1990s onward, concern has been raised over the use of BADGE-based epoxy resins in the lining of some cans for foodstuffs, with the chemical being found to leach into foods. Bisphenol A Diglycidyl ether-based epoxy coatings are extensively used for coating the inside of cans which come into contact with food and are thus food contact materials. The materials and analogues and conjugates have been extensively tested for and analytical methods developed.

See also
 Bisphenol AF (BPAF)
 Bisphenol S (BPS)
 EPI-001

References

Glycidyl ethers
IARC Group 3 carcinogens
Nonsteroidal antiandrogens
Phenol ethers
PPAR agonists
2,2-Bis(4-hydroxyphenyl)propanes